Toby Scheckter (born 25 August 1978) is a South African racing driver. He is the son of 1979 Formula One World Champion Jody Scheckter, and the brother of IndyCar Series driver Tomas Scheckter. He won the Skusa SUPERNATS kart finals in Las Vegas in 2004. He has also competed in such series as Eurocup Formula Renault 2.0 and the British Formula Three Championship. Scheckter recently launched Scheckter's Organic Beverages Ltd and their first product, Scheckter's OrganicEnergy drink.

References

External links
 Career statistics from Driver Database
 Jewish Racing Drivers Association

1978 births
Living people
People from Monte Carlo
South African Jews
South African racing drivers
German Formula Three Championship drivers
British Formula Three Championship drivers
Formula Renault Eurocup drivers
ASCAR drivers

Opel Team BSR drivers
Morand Racing drivers
Manor Motorsport drivers